Sifiso Mzobe is a South African author.

Biography 
Mzobe was born and raised in the Durban township of Umlazi. He attended St Francis College in Mariannhill, then studied Journalism at Damelin Business Campus in Durban. He has worked for community newspapers and as a freelance journalist.
His debut novel Young Blood (2010) won a number of awards, including the 2012 Wole Soyinka Prize for Literature in Africa, and was also listed in the Sunday Independent′s Top Ten Books of 2010.

Awards and honours 
2011 Herman Charles Bosman Prize, Young Blood 
2011 The Sunday Times Fiction Prize, Young Blood
2011 South African Literary Award for a First-Time Published Author
2012 Wole Soyinka Prize for Literature in Africa, Young Blood

Bibliography 
 Young Blood, Kwela Books, 2010 
 Durban december, Kwela Books, 2015
 Searching for Simphiwe: And Other Stories, Kwela Books, 2020

References

Living people
South African male novelists
21st-century South African novelists
21st-century South African male writers
People from Durban
Year of birth missing (living people)